Devon Wood is an American politician.

Personal life
Wood's father is a farmer, and her mother is a teacher. She graduated from Shenandoah High School in Shenandoah, Iowa in 2015, and is a resident of New Market, Iowa. She later graduated from Simpson College. Wood wrote for The Simpsonian student publication between 2018 and 2020, and also played softball for the Simpson College Storm.

Political career
While attending college, Wood led the Simpson College Republicans and was vice chair and later chair of the Iowa Federation of College Republicans. She also worked for state legislators Clel Baudler and Mary Ann Hanusa.

After incumbent legislator Matt Windschitl was redistricted from District 17 of the Iowa House of Representatives and Cecil Dolecheck announced his retirement, Wood decided to run for office. She defeated Paul Dykstra, who previously served as a Ringgold County supervisor, in the Republican Party primary. Wood won the general election against Pat Shipley, a teacher, and mayor of Nodaway, Iowa, affiliated with the Democratic Party.

Referecnes

Simpson College alumni
People from Taylor County, Iowa
21st-century American politicians
Living people
Republican Party members of the Iowa House of Representatives
21st-century American women politicians
Women state legislators in Iowa
Year of birth missing (living people)